Carpatolechia is a genus of moths in the family Gelechiidae.

Species
 Carpatolechia aenigma (Sattler, 1983)
 Carpatolechia alburnella (Zeller, 1839)
 Carpatolechia daehania (Park, 1993)
 Carpatolechia decorella (Haworth, 1812)
 Carpatolechia deogyusanae (Park, 1992)
 Carpatolechia digitilobella (Park, 1992)
 Carpatolechia epomidella (Tengström, 1869)
 Carpatolechia filipjevi (Lvovsky & Piskunov, 1993)
 Carpatolechia fugacella (Zeller, 1839)
 Carpatolechia fugitivella (Zeller, 1839)
 Carpatolechia intermediella Huemer & Karsholt, 1999
 Carpatolechia longivalvella (Park, 1992)
 Carpatolechia minor (Kasy, 1978)
 Carpatolechia notatella (Hübner, [1813])
 Carpatolechia proximella (Hübner, 1796)
 Carpatolechia yangyangensis (Park, 1992)

Former species
 Carpatolechia buckwelli
 Carpatolechia deserta
 Carpatolechia dodecella
 Carpatolechia dumitrescui
 Carpatolechia erschoffii
 Carpatolechia euratella
 Carpatolechia griseella
 Carpatolechia humeralella
 Carpatolechia humeralis
 Carpatolechia incretella
 Carpatolechia inscriptella
 Carpatolechia lyellella
 Carpatolechia melanostictella 
 Carpatolechia mersinella 
 Carpatolechia myricae 
 Carpatolechia nigrofasciella
 Carpatolechia ochracella
 Carpatolechia oskella
 Carpatolechia paripunctella 
 Carpatolechia peritella 
 Carpatolechia praedicata 
 Carpatolechia radiella
 Carpatolechia sagittella 
 Carpatolechia scabra
 Carpatolechia signatella
 Carpatolechia subericolella
 Carpatolechia sultanella 
 Carpatolechia tigratella 
 Carpatolechia tribolopis 
 Carpatolechia trijugella 
 Carpatolechia triparella

References

 
Litini
Moth genera